Bapbi Gewog was a gewog (village block) of Thimphu  District, Bhutan.

References

Former gewogs of Bhutan
Thimphu District